The Scottish Cup is the annual knock-out cup competition for domestic rugby union clubs in Scotland. The cup has been competed for since the 1995-1996 season. The competition was in abeyance between 2019 and 2022, initially due to the Covid-19 pandemic, and made its return in the 2022-23 season. Despite many structural changes the competition has always culminated with the final at Murrayfield Stadium.

Format

Clubs in the three National Leagues compete in the first round, with six Premiership sides added in the second round, and the final four Premiership teams added in the third round of the competition.

As part of the Scottish Cup Finals day, the finals of the Shield and Bowl competitions are also held. Clubs outside the National League compete in one of four regional tournaments (Borders, Caledonia, Edinburgh, and West) during the season, with the winners of each playing in a semi-final against another region. The winners progress to the final at Murrayfield.

Cup Finals
A total of 12 clubs have appeared in the final, of whom 8 have won the competition.

* after extra time

bold - winning team were also Scottish Premiership champions

Scottish Cup Wins by Club
Boroughmuir: 4
Heriot's: 4
Melrose: 4
Ayr: 4
Glasgow Hawks: 3
Gala: 2
Hawick: 2
Watsonians: 1

2006-2007: Scottish SuperCup
In season 2006-2007 Premiership One consisted of only 10 clubs, a situation that saw a supplementary competition, the Scottish SuperCup created. The competition included the 10 clubs split into two groups of 5, with the pool winners meeting in a Final at Myreside. With Premiership One reverting to 12 clubs again for 2007-2008, it was abandoned after only one season.

References

Recurring sporting events established in 1995

Rugby in Scotland